Ralph Escott Hancock (20 December 1887 – 29 October 1914) played first-class cricket for Somerset in nine matches between 1907 and 1914. He was born at Llandaff in Glamorgan and died in the First World War at Festubert, La Bassee, France.

Ralph Hancock's father was Frank Hancock, a member of the Cardiff brewing company and a pioneering rugby union international for Wales; his uncles Froude Hancock and William Hancock played rugby union for England and William also appeared in one cricket match for Somerset in 1892.

Educated at Rugby School, Ralph Hancock was a right-handed middle-order batsman and an occasional bowler. He made his first-class cricket debut in the match against the South Africans at Bath in 1907, but achieved little in that game, nor in two further matches in 1908. He then disappeared from first-class cricket for four seasons before reappearing, with greater success, in four games in the 1913 season. These games included the match against Sussex at Eastbourne, in which Hancock scored 28 and 34, the two highest scores of his first-class career. He was not successful in two games in the 1914 season.

Hancock was serving as a lieutenant in the Devonshire Regiment when he was killed less than three months into the First World War. According to his record in the Commonwealth War Graves Commission, he had been awarded the Distinguished Service Order and had been mentioned in dispatches. The same source records that he was survived by his parents, who were then living in Wiveliscombe, Somerset and by his wife Mary Hamilton Hancock.

References

1887 births
1914 deaths
English cricketers
Welsh cricketers
Somerset cricketers
People educated at Rugby School
People from Llandaff
British military personnel killed in World War I